Bol Manute Bol (born November 16, 1999) is a South Sudanese-American professional basketball player for the Orlando Magic of the National Basketball Association (NBA). He played college basketball for the Oregon Ducks. A son of basketball player Manute Bol (who was known for being one of the tallest NBA players in history), Bol was born in Khartoum, Sudan, but began living in Kansas City area from a young age. In high school, Bol was considered one of the best players in the class of 2018, having been rated a consensus five-star recruit and earning McDonald's All-American honors.

Bol started his high school career at Blue Valley Northwest High School, where he was assigned to the junior varsity team. He transferred to Bishop Miege High School in the middle of the season but remained on junior varsity due to transfer rules. He joined varsity in his second year. As a junior, he moved to Mater Dei High School in Santa Ana, California, rising in profile as a recruit. In his final season, Bol played for Findlay Prep in Henderson, Nevada. At the international level, he represents the United States but has never competed for them in a FIBA tournament. He was drafted with the 44th pick in the 2019 NBA draft by the Miami Heat, but was traded to the Denver Nuggets on draft day.

Early life
Bol was born on November 16, 1999, in Khartoum, Sudan, as the second child of former National Basketball Association (NBA) star Manute Bol and his wife Ajok Kuag. He was named after his late great-grandfather and Dinka chief Bol Chol Bol. In 1998, after an American missile strike during the Second Sudanese Civil War, Manute was accused of being an American spy and was barred by the Sudanese government from fleeing to the United States. In 2001, the family traveled to Cairo, Egypt, where they were stranded for many months due to visa problems, despite having acquired tickets to the United States from American friends.

In the following year, when Bol was two years old, his family moved to Connecticut as designated political refugees. Upon encouragement from his father, he began playing basketball at age four, although he was initially reluctant. Bol eventually began training with his father in the gym. At age seven, he moved to Olathe, Kansas, a city with a large South Sudanese population. As a  seventh grader, Bol featured in a highlight video at an Indianapolis basketball camp that drew attention from CBS Sports and The Washington Post. His first NCAA Division I offer came from New Mexico State, when he was still in the eighth grade.

High school career
For the beginning of his freshman basketball season, Bol played for the junior varsity team of Blue Valley Northwest High School in Overland Park, Kansas. Because he did not live in his school district, Bol transferred to Bishop Miege High School in Roeland Park, Kansas where he continued his freshman season. Bol made his debut for the Bishop Miege junior varsity team on December 11, 2014, displaying his shot blocking and shooting ability. Despite becoming eligible on the varsity team by the end of the season, he did not earn playing time. On March 4, 2015, sports website Bleacher Report compared him to a taller Kevin Durant. In May, Bol played for his under-15 Amateur Athletic Union (AAU) team KC Run GMC at the Jayhawk Invitational in Kansas City, Missouri, scoring 15 points in one game. By then, he was receiving interest from a number of NCAA Division I programs, including Kansas and Oklahoma.

In his sophomore season, Bol was ranked as one of the top players in the class of 2018 by recruiting service 247Sports. On January 6, 2016, in his fourth varsity game, he posted 16 points in a 59–57 upset loss to Hogan Preparatory Academy. Bol contributed 14 points to help Bishop Miege win the Kansas Class 4A Division I state title game, 69–59, over McPherson High School in March. After leading his team to a 22-win season, he earned class 4A-I first-team honors. In April 2016, he received a scholarship offer from Kansas.

In November 2016, Bol announced that he was transferring from Bishop Miege to Mater Dei High School in Santa Ana, California for his junior year. He was encouraged to join the program because of its head coach Gary McKnight. Bol debuted for Mater Dei on January 24, 2017, recording 21 points, 10 rebounds, and 3 blocks to coast past Orange Lutheran High School. On February 24, he recorded 14 points, 14 rebounds, and 5 blocks in an overtime win over defending national champions Chino Hills High School. He scored 15 points in a March 4 loss to Bishop Montgomery High School at the CIF Southern Section Open Division title game. On March 14, at the Open Division semifinals, Bol led Mater Dei with 15 points and 6 rebounds as they defeated St. Augustine High School. He averaged 16.5 points, 8.6 rebounds, and 2.9 blocks per game as a junior, leading his team to a California Interscholastic Federation (CIF) runner-up finish. During the season he received offers from Arizona, USC, and Oregon, as well as offers from Kentucky and UCLA. In May, at the Nike Elite Youth Basketball League (EYBL) with his team California Supreme, Bol averaged 25.4 points, 9.9 rebounds and 4.1 blocks per game.

Bol transferred to Findlay Prep in Henderson, Nevada in November 2017, where he would play under head coach Paul Washington. His head coach at Mater Dei said that Bol made the move due to "family reasons." Shortly after, he committed to play college basketball for Oregon, choosing them over Kentucky. Before the season, Bol was included among 20 players in the USA Today preseason boys' basketball team. On November 27, 2017, he recorded 30 points, 8 rebounds, and 4 blocks in a 66–61 win over Morgan Park High School at the Like Mike Invitational. Bol scored 32 points in 21 minutes, shooting 14-of-17 from the field, in a January 14, 2018 rout of Immaculate Conception High School at the Spalding Hoophall Classic. He was selected for the 2018 McDonald's All-American Boys Game, but was unable to play due to injury. Bol finished his senior season at Findlay Prep averaging 20.4 points, 8.2 rebounds, and 2.4 blocks per game, earning All-USA Boys Basketball Second-Team honors from USA Today High School Sports.

Recruiting

College career
Bol joined Oregon as a freshman in the 2018–19 season under head coach Dana Altman. Entering the season, he was considered one of the best prospects for the upcoming NBA draft, although analysts described him as a polarizing prospect in the long term. On November 6, 2018, Bol debuted with a double-double of 12 points, 12 rebounds, and 3 blocks in 23 minutes against Portland State. He later recorded a season-high 32 points and 11 rebounds in an 89–84 loss to Texas Southern. After recording 20 points, 9 rebounds, and 4 blocks in a 66–54 win over San Diego on December 12, Bol injured his left foot and missed the rest of the season. He declared for the NBA Draft after his freshman season. Bol was projected as the third pick in the 2019 NBA Draft behind Zion Williamson and RJ Barrett before his season-ending injury.

Professional career

Denver Nuggets (2019–2022) 
Bol was drafted with the 44th pick of the 2019 NBA draft by the Miami Heat. He was originally mentioned as a top 3–10 pick but slid in the draft until the second round. His draft rights were then traded to the Denver Nuggets for a 2022 second-round draft pick acquired from the Philadelphia 76ers. On September 6, 2019, Bol signed a two-way contract with the Nuggets, splitting time with the Windy City Bulls. He had his first double double in the NBA G League on November 20, recording 16 points, 11 rebounds and two blocks in a 115–105 win over the Fort Wayne Mad Ants. On November 24, the Nuggets recalled Bol.

Bol eventually made his NBA debut in the 2020 NBA Bubble on August 1, 2020, recording 5 points and 4 rebounds in under 11 minutes of play in a 105–125 loss to the Miami Heat. The Nuggets finished as the third seed in the Western Conference, and faced the Utah Jazz during their first round matchup. Bol made his playoff debut on August 19, scoring two points in a 105–124 Game 2 loss. The Nuggets eliminated the Jazz in seven games, and advanced to face the Los Angeles Clippers in the second round, whom they defeated in another seven-game series. The Nuggets eventually fell to the Los Angeles Lakers in the Western Conference Finals, losing in five games.

On January 1, 2022, Bol scored a season-high 11 points, alongside three rebounds, in a 124–111 win over the Houston Rockets. On January 10, Bol was traded to the Detroit Pistons in exchange for Rodney McGruder and a 2022 second-round draft pick via the Brooklyn Nets. The trade was voided on January 13, after Bol failed his physical fitness exam. On January 18, he underwent surgery on his right foot and was listed as out indefinitely.

Orlando Magic (2022–present) 
On January 19, 2022, Bol and PJ Dozier were traded to the Boston Celtics in a three-team transaction involving the San Antonio Spurs, which sent Juancho Hernangómez to San Antonio and Bryn Forbes to Denver. On February 10, before playing in a game for the Celtics, Bol and Dozier were traded to the Orlando Magic, alongside a future second-round draft pick and cash considerations, for a 2023 protected second-round pick. On March 15, he was ruled out for the remainder of the season.

On July 7, 2022, Bol re-signed with the Magic. On November 16, Bol recorded a career-high 26 points, alongside 12 rebounds, and three blocks in a 108–126 loss to the Minnesota Timberwolves.

National team career
After taking part in training camp, Bol was a finalist to make the United States roster for the 2017 FIBA Under-19 Basketball World Cup. However, he was later cut from the squad by head coach John Calipari.

In April 2018, Bol drew attention at the Nike Hoop Summit, playing for the United States junior national select team. He recorded 20 points, 9 rebounds, 6 assists, and 5 steals in an 89–76 loss to Team World, which was made up of international players playing high school basketball in the United States.

Career statistics

NBA

Regular season

|-
| style="text-align:left;"|
| style="text-align:left;"|Denver
| 7 || 0 || 12.4 || .500 || .444 || .800 || 2.7 || .9 || .3 || .9 || 5.7
|-
| style="text-align:left;"|
| style="text-align:left;"|Denver
| 32 || 2 || 5.0 || .431 || .375 || .667 || .8 || .2 || .1 || .3 || 2.2
|-
| style="text-align:left;"|
| style="text-align:left;"|Denver
| 14 || 0 || 5.8 || .556 || .250 || .400 || 1.4 || .4 || .1 || .1 || 2.4
|- class="sortbottom"
| style="text-align:center;" colspan="2"| Career
| 53 || 2 || 6.2 || .478 || .378 || .667 || 1.2 || .3 || .1 || .3 || 2.7

Playoffs

|-
| style="text-align:left;"|2020
| style="text-align:left;"|Denver
| 4 || 0 || 5.3 || .556 || .667 || .875 || 1.3 || .0 || .5 || .5 || 4.8
|-
| style="text-align:left;"|2021
| style="text-align:left;"|Denver
| 3 || 0 || 2.0 || .000 || .000 ||  || .3 || .7 || .0 || .0 || .0
|- class="sortbottom"
| style="text-align:center;" colspan="2"| Career
| 7 || 0 || 3.9 || .500 || .500 || .875 || .9 || .3 || .3 || .3 || 2.7

College

|-
| style="text-align:left;"| 2018–19
| style="text-align:left;"| Oregon
| 9 || 9 || 29.8 || .561 || .520 || .757 || 9.6 || 1.0 || .8 || 2.7 || 21.0

Personal life
Bol is the son of former NBA player Manute Bol. Bol has ten siblings, including Madut, who played college basketball at Southern University and graduated in 2013.

References

External links
Oregon Ducks bio
USA Basketball bio

1999 births
Living people
21st-century African-American sportspeople
African-American basketball players
American men's basketball players
South Sudanese emigrants to the United States
American sportspeople of African descent
American people of Sudanese descent
Basketball players from Kansas
Bishop Miege High School alumni
Centers (basketball)
Denver Nuggets players
Dinka people
Findlay Prep alumni
McDonald's High School All-Americans
Miami Heat draft picks
Oregon Ducks men's basketball players
Orlando Magic players
Sportspeople from Olathe, Kansas
Power forwards (basketball)
Sportspeople from Santa Ana, California
Sportspeople of South Sudanese descent
Windy City Bulls players
Refugees in the United States
South Sudanese refugees